The Shire of Hampden was a local government area about  west-southwest of Melbourne, the state capital of Victoria, Australia.

History

Hampden was first incorporated as the Hampden and Heytesbury Road District on 28 April 1857, and became a shire on 31 December 1863. On 31 May 1895, it lost parts of its East and West Wards to create the Shire of Heytesbury. On 9 September 1952, the Borough of Camperdown severed from its East Riding. Its boundary was adjusted on 31 May 1977, to include all of Skipton.

On 23 September 1994, the Shire of Hampden was abolished, and along with the Town of Camperdown and parts of the Shires of Colac, Heytesbury and Mortlake, and the area around Princetown, on the Great Ocean Road, was amalgamated into the newly created Shire of Corangamite.

Wards

The Shire of Hampden was divided into three ridings, each of which elected three councillors:
 North Riding
 South Riding
 West Riding

Towns and localities
 Berrybank
 Bookaar
 Boorcan
 Bradvale
 Chocolyn
 Derrinallum
 Duverney
 Foxhow
 Glenormiston
 Gnotuk
 Kariah
 Leslie Manor
 Lismore
 Mingay
 Mount Bute
 Naroghid
 Noorat
 Skipton
 Terang
 Vite Vite
 Weerite

Population

* Estimate in the 1958 Victorian Year Book.

References

External links
 Victorian Places - Hampden Shire

Hampden